Gordon Pritchard (born 26 September 1954) is a Welsh rugby union and professional rugby league footballer who played in the 1970s and 1980s, and coached rugby union in the 1990s and 2000s.

Playing career

International honours
Gordon Pritchard won caps for Wales while at Barrow, and Cardiff City (Bridgend) Blue Dragons 1978…1981 1(3?)-caps + 2-caps (interchange/substitute).

Club career
Pritchard played a season with the Eastern Suburbs club in the Canterbury Rugby League competition.

Note
Before the start of the 1984/85 season, Cardiff City Blue Dragons relocated from Ninian Park in Cardiff, to Coychurch Road Ground in Bridgend, and were renamed Bridgend Blue Dragons.

References

External links
Statistics at cardiffrfc.com
Statistics at blackandambers.co.uk
Rugby League - A Part Of Cardiff - By Jonathan Price
Calendars Of The Players Association at huddersfieldrlheritage.co.uk
Pritchard: Game being carved up
Pritchard quits Caerphilly

1954 births
Living people
Barrow Raiders players
Bradford Bulls players
Cardiff City Blue Dragons players
Cardiff RFC players
Huddersfield Giants players
Leeds Rhinos players
Newport RFC players
Rugby league fullbacks
Rugby league players from Cardiff
Rugby union wings
Rugby union players from Cardiff
Welsh rugby league players
Welsh rugby union players
Welsh rugby union coaches
Wales national rugby league team players